Cóndor railway station on the Rio Mulatos-Potosí line, Bolivia, is the highest station in the western hemisphere, at an altitude of 4,786 m (15,700 ft) above sea level. It is located in a remote, mountainous area, with little around the station area.

Overview
It was the world's highest station until opening of Tanggula railway station on the Qinghai–Tibet Railway line in Tibet in 2006 at 5,072 m (16,500 ft).

See also
 List of highest railway stations in the world

References

Railway stations in Bolivia